Sheridan School District is a public school district headquartered in Sheridan, Arkansas, United States. The district serves areas of Grant County, including Sheridan, and Saline County, including the unincorporated area of East End.

History
The Grapevine School District merged into the Sheridan district on July 1, 1985. The Leola School District merged into the Sheridan one on July 1, 1987. The Prattsville School District merged into the Sheridan district on July 1, 1994.

Schools
Secondary schools
 Sheridan High School (Sheridan): Grades 9-12
 Junior High/Middle School 
Grades 6-8
 Sheridan Middle School (Sheridan)
 East End Middle School (unincorporated Saline County)

Primary schools
 Intermediate schools (Grades 3–5)
 East End Intermediate School (unincorporated Saline County)
 Sheridan Intermediate School (Sheridan)
 Elementary schools: (Grades K-2)
 East End Elementary School (unincorporated Saline County)
 Sheridan Elementary School (Sheridan)

References

Further reading
These include maps of predecessor districts:
 (Download)
 (Download)

External links
 

School districts in Arkansas
Education in Grant County, Arkansas
Education in Saline County, Arkansas